Ricardo Mauricio Clarke Hamilton (born 27 September 1992) is a Panamanian professional footballer who plays as a winger for the Panama national team.

Club career
In September 2012 Clarke joined the A-League side Wellington Phoenix on loan as injury cover for Dani Sánchez. In August 2013 he was snapped up by Venezuelan side Zamora.

On 3 July 2017, Clarke signed a three-year deal with Boavista F.C. in the Primeira Liga.

References

External links
 
 
 

1992 births
Living people
Association football wingers
Panamanian footballers
Panama international footballers
Liga Panameña de Fútbol players
A-League Men players
Primeira Liga players
Venezuelan Primera División players
Paraguayan Primera División players
Bolivian Primera División players
Sporting San Miguelito players
Wellington Phoenix FC players
Zamora FC players
Boavista F.C. players
Club Nacional footballers
Club Guaraní players
The Strongest players
Panamanian expatriate footballers
Panamanian expatriate sportspeople in New Zealand
Expatriate association footballers in New Zealand
Expatriate footballers in Venezuela
Panamanian expatriate sportspeople in Venezuela
Expatriate footballers in Portugal
Panamanian expatriate sportspeople in Portugal
Expatriate footballers in Paraguay
Panamanian expatriate sportspeople in Paraguay
Expatriate footballers in Bolivia
Panamanian expatriate sportspeople in Bolivia
2017 CONCACAF Gold Cup players